Halovibrio salipaludis is a Gram-negative, aerobic, halophilic and motile bacterium from the genus of Halovibrio which has been isolated from saline-alkaline wetland soil from Binhai.

References

Oceanospirillales
Bacteria described in 2021